Frederick W. Williams was the Speaker of the Legislative Assembly of British Columbia from 1878 to 1882. He represented the electoral district of Esquimalt.

References

Speakers of the Legislative Assembly of British Columbia